General elections were held in Sierra Leone on 26 and 27 February 1996 to elect the President and members of Parliament, with a second round of the presidential election on 15 March. They were the first elections since multi-party democracy had been reintroduced following a referendum on a new constitution in 1991, and the first multi-party elections held in the country since 1977.

The presidential elections were won by Ahmed Tejan Kabbah of the Sierra Leone People's Party (SLPP), who defeated John Karefa-Smart of the United National People's Party in the second round by 60% to 40%. In the parliamentary elections, the SLPP became the largest party for the first time in 29 years, winning 27 of the 68 elected seats, whilst the UNPP finished second with 17 seats. 

The All People's Congress, which had governed from 1968 to 1992 (from 1978 to 1991 as the only legal party), ran in a contested election for the first time in two decades. It finished fourth in the parliamentary election, whilst its presidential candidate, Edward Turay, finished a distant fifth with only 5.1 percent of the vote.

Electoral system
The elections were a transitional event as the country moved to implement the 1991 constitution and move from military rule to civilian rule. The president was elected using the two-round system. The parliamentary elections were held using proportional representation with a single nationwide constituency with a 5% electoral threshold. Previously the country had used first-past-the-post voting for parliamentary elections. The use of proportional representation in 1996 and 2002 has been described as Sierra Leone's "brief experiment" with proportional representation.

Results

President
As no candidate won more than 55% of the vote in the first round, a second round of voting was held.

Parliament
The SLPP won the most seats in the elections, but fell well short of a majority, with only 27 of the 68 elected seats.

Aftermath
On 25 May 1997 Kabbah was deposed by a coup led by Johnny Paul Koroma. However, he was returned to power by Nigerian-led ECOWAS forces on 10 March 1998.

References

Election Presidential
Sierra Leone
Elections in Sierra Leone
Presidential elections in Sierra Leone
Election and referendum articles with incomplete results